The 2015 Taça de Angola was the 34th edition of the Taça de Angola, the second most important and the top knock-out football club competition in Angola, following the Girabola. Benfica de Luanda were the defending champions, having beaten Petro de Luanda 1–0 in the previous season's final.

Bravos do Maquis who were entitled to participate in the 2016 CAF Confederation Cup as the cup winner, later withdrew for financial reasons, giving way for the runner-up, Sagrada Esperança.

Stadiums and locations

Championship bracket

Preliminary rounds

Round of 16

Quarter-finals

Semi-finals

Final

See also
 2015 Girabola
 2016 Angola Super Cup
 2016 CAF Confederation Cup
 Bravos do Maquis players
 Sagrada Esperança players

References

External links
 Tournament profile at girabola.com

Angola Cup
Taca de Angola
Taca de Angola